The men's 50 metre backstroke event at the 2001 World Aquatics Championships took place 25 July. The heats and swmi-finals took place 24 July, with the final being held on 25 July.

Records
Prior to the competition, the existing world and championship records were as follows.

Results

Heats

Final

References
Results from swimrankings.net Retrieved 2012-08-23

Swimming at the 2001 World Aquatics Championships